Hanging Rock State Park is a  North Carolina state park in Stokes County, North Carolina in the United States.

History

On April 20, 1936, the Winston-Salem Foundation and the Stokes County Committee for Hanging Rock donated  to North Carolina for establishing a state park.  Prior to this, the land had been owned by developers intent on creating a mountain resort on its highest summit.  The plans fell through when the developers went bankrupt during the initial construction.  After the state acquired the property, the Civilian Conservation Corps built the original facilities between 1935 and 1942, including the construction of a  lake and bathhouse that was listed on the National Register of Historic Places in 1991.  Additional land acquisitions in the 1970s added to the park the Lower Cascades, a spectacular  waterfall, and the Tory's Den, a rock outcropping rumored to have served as a hideout for British Loyalists during the American Revolutionary War.  Another large land purchase in 2000 added Flat Shoals Mountain, a smaller summit visible from the top of Hanging Rock, to the park.

Location

Hanging Rock State Park is located in the Sauratown Mountain Range, one of the most easterly mountain ranges in the state. Often called "the mountains away from the mountains," the Sauratown range is made up of monadnocks that are separated from the nearby Blue Ridge Mountains. The Sauratown Mountains lie completely within the borders of Stokes and Surry counties. The most well known peak in the range is Pilot Mountain in nearby Pilot Mountain State Park. The highest point in the park – and the highest point in the Sauratown Mountain range – is Moore's Knob. It rises to 2,579 feet (786 m) above sea level.

Named for the Saura Native Americans who were early inhabitants of the region, the rocky tops of the Sauratown Mountains are the remnants of a once-broad layer of rock that covered the region. Over many years, wind, water and other forces eroded the surrounding blanket of rock. What remains of these ancient mountains is the erosion-resistant quartzite, which now supports scenic ridges and knobs, including Moore's Knob, Moore's Wall, Cook's Wall, Devil's Chimney, Wolf Rock and Hanging Rock.

Ecology

Due to its unique location, the park is home to a number of species of flora that are more commonly found in the westernmost part of the state. Carolina and Canadian hemlock grow alongside each other, and in the spring visitors can view the colorful displays of rhododendron, mountain laurel, pinxter azalea, and a number of other wildflowers. Much of the park is an oak-hickory forest, with chestnut oak the dominant hardwood.

The park is also home to the rare Wehrle's salamander, and peregrine falcons have been known to nest in the crags on the park's high peaks. Ravens and vultures may be seen calling and circling overhead. Visitors might see white-tailed deer and wild turkey while walking the park trails.

Two venomous snakes, the copperhead and timber rattlesnake, live in the park, but they do not bother unless provoked. All wildlife is protected at Hanging Rock just as in all other North Carolina State Parks.

Activities

The park has a 73-site tent and trailer campground (minus R/V hookups) and 10 vacation cabins for overnight accommodations. The lake and bathhouse, open from June – Labor Day, offers swimming and boat rentals. Rock climbing is permitted at Moore's Wall and Cook's Wall but is not allowed at the Hanging Rock summit. The visitor's center and museum room is open daily. There is no admission fee to the park.

The Mountains-to-Sea Trail pass through the park and joins with the Sauratown Trail.

Waterfalls

The park is the home to at least 5 significant waterfalls (listed in order of height):

Tory's Falls
Upper Cascades
Lower Cascades
Window Falls
Hidden Falls

Nearby state parks
The following state parks are within  of Hanging Rock State Park:
Haw River State Park
Mayo River State Park
Pilot Mountain State Park

References

External links

 
 
 Website with Pictures and Map of Hanging Rock

Protected areas established in 1935
State parks of North Carolina
State parks of the Appalachians
Protected areas of Stokes County, North Carolina
Inselbergs of Piedmont (United States)
Civilian Conservation Corps in North Carolina
Nature centers in North Carolina
Buildings and structures on the National Register of Historic Places in North Carolina
Buildings and structures in Stokes County, North Carolina
National Register of Historic Places in Stokes County, North Carolina
Historic districts on the National Register of Historic Places in North Carolina
Public baths on the National Register of Historic Places